The River Kalisil originates in the hills near Rajpura village in Sawai Madhopur District. The river flows generally southwest, partly through hills and partly in the plains of Sawai Madhopur District, for about 48 km, before joining the Morel River.

Rivers of Rajasthan
Rivers of India